Jeffrey Andrew Cross (born September 1, 1961) is a retired American basketball player.  He played for the Los Angeles Clippers in the National Basketball Association (NBA).

Cross, a forward/center from Worcester Academy in Massachusetts,  played collegiately at the University of Maine where he enjoyed a standout career, scoring 1,337 points (average of 13.4 per game), grabbing 894 rebounds (8.9) and blocking 209 shots (2.1).  Cross was named all conference his junior and senior years and was ECAC North (now the America East Conference) player of the year as a junior in 1983.  He left Maine as one of the school's top all-time scorers and rebounders.

Cross was drafted in the third round of the 1984 NBA Draft by the Dallas Mavericks (61st overall).  However, his rights were traded to the Philadelphia 76ers and he was later waived.  After nearly two years, he would make his NBA debut in the form of a 10-day contract with the Los Angeles Clippers in the 1985–86 NBA season.  He was subsequently signed for the remainder of the year.  Cross' NBA career lasted 21 games as he averaged 6.1 minutes per game in a reserve role.  His career averages were 1.2 points and 1.4 rebounds per game.

References

1961 births
Living people
American expatriate basketball people in Spain
American men's basketball players
Basketball players from Chicago
Baloncesto Málaga players
Centers (basketball)
Charleston Gunners players
Dallas Mavericks draft picks
Liga ACB players
Los Angeles Clippers players
Maine Black Bears men's basketball players
Maine Windjammers players
Power forwards (basketball)
Worcester Academy alumni